Three Hearts is the second solo album by rock musician and former Fleetwood Mac guitarist Bob Welch.
 
Just like Welch's previous effort French Kiss, Three Hearts was a commercial success. The album reached number 20 on the US charts in 1979 and went gold. It spawned a hit single, "Precious Love", which peaked at number 19, making it Welch's last top 20 hit. "Church" was also a small hit, and peaked at number 73. Don't Wait Too Long" is a reworking of "Good Things (Come to Those who Wait)", a Welch composition that had been left off the Fleetwood Mac album Mystery to Me.

The album was reissued by Culture Factory in 2013 in a miniature replica LP sleeve, with 3 bonus cuts including the French version of "Precious Love". However, to this day, the 12-inch extended mix of "Precious Love" has never been released on CD.

Track listing
All songs by Bob Welch except where noted

 "3 Hearts" – 3:23
 "Oh Jenny" – 4:17
 "I Saw Her Standing There" (Lennon/McCartney) – 2:53
 "Here Comes the Night" – 3:03
 "China" – 3:21
 "The Ghost of Flight 401" – 3:16
 "Precious Love" – 3:12
 "Church" – 3:06
 "Come Softly to Me" (Gary Troxel, Gretchen Christopher, Barbara Ellis) – 2:42
 "Devil Wind" – 4:03
 "Don't Wait Too Long" – 3:50
 "Little Star" – 3:41

Bonus tracks on 2012 CD re-issue
 "3 Hearts" [Alternate Version] – 3:20
 "Une Fille Comme Toi" [French Version of Precious Love] – 3:13
 "Something Strong" [B-side of Precious Love] – 3:55

Personnel

Musicians
 Bob Welch – vocals, guitar, bass guitar, keyboards
 Todd Sharp – guitar
 David Adelstein – keyboards, synthesizer
 Alvin Taylor – drums
 Mick Fleetwood – drums, percussion (track 6) 
 Christine McVie – keyboards, vocals (tracks 9 & 11)
 Stevie Nicks – vocals (track 10)
 Steve Foreman – percussion
 Gene Page – string arrangements

Technical
 John Carter – producer
 Richard Dashut – producer (track 6)
 Warren Dewey – engineer
 Ken Perry – mastering
 Neal Preston, Olivier Ferrand, Sam Emerson – photography

Charts

References

1979 albums
Bob Welch (musician) albums
Albums arranged by Gene Page
Albums produced by Richard Dashut
Capitol Records albums
Albums recorded at Sunset Sound Recorders